The Mindanao pygmy fruit bat (Alionycteris paucidentata) is a species of megabat in the family Pteropodidae. It is the only species within the genus Alionycteris. It is endemic to the Philippines.  Its natural habitat is subtropical or tropical dry forests at high elevations that are either scarce or overtaken by tourist hotspots. As a result, this species may be seeking new elevated habitats likely in the southern region of the Philippines and along the islands of Sulawesi.

References

Mammals described in 1969
Mammals of the Philippines
Endemic fauna of the Philippines
Fauna of Mindanao
Bats of Southeast Asia
Megabats
Taxonomy articles created by Polbot